Ion Coliban (born 6 June 1925) was a Romanian alpine skier. He competed at the 1948 Winter Olympics and the 1952 Winter Olympics.

References

External links

1925 births
Year of death missing
Romanian male alpine skiers
Olympic alpine skiers of Romania
Alpine skiers at the 1948 Winter Olympics
Alpine skiers at the 1952 Winter Olympics
Sportspeople from Brașov